Douglas Myers (1910–1962) was a British film editor.

Filmography

 The Beloved Vagabond (1936)
 The Street Singer (1937)
 Night Journey (1938)
 Sons of the Sea (1939)
 Law and Disorder (1940)
 'Pimpernel' Smith (1941)
 The First of the Few (1942)
 The Adventures of Tartu (1943)
 Tawny Pipit (1944)
 Twilight Hour (1945)
 Waltz Time (1945)
 The Agitator (1945)
 Murder in Reverse? (1945)
 Old Mother Riley at Home (1945)
 Lisbon Story (1946)
 Loyal Heart (1946)
 Who Killed Van Loon? (1948)
 Corridor of Mirrors (1948)
 One Night with You (1948)
 Forbidden (1949)
 Miss Pilgrim's Progress (1949)
 Murder at the Windmill (1949)
 Old Mother Riley's New Venture (1949)
 Old Mother Riley, Headmistress (1950)
 The Late Edwina Black (1951)
 The Wedding of Lilli Marlene (1953)
 The Runaway Bus (1954)
 Life with the Lyons (1954)
 The Lyons in Paris (1955)
 They Can't Hang Me (1955)
 The Gelignite Gang (1956)
 Hour of Decision (1957)
 Professor Tim (1957)
 Undercover Girl (1958)
 Stormy Crossing (1958)
 Blood of the Vampire (1958)
 The Price of Silence (1959)
 Boyd's Shop (1960)

References

Bibliography
 Gerard Garrett. The films of David Niven. LSP Books, 1975.

External links

1910 births
1962 deaths
Film people from London
British film editors